Back Pages is the 17th studio album by America, released on July 26, 2011 by eOne. The album is the band's first studio album of cover versions of songs by some of their favorite songwriters. The album features guest appearances by Mark Knopfler and Van Dyke Parks.

Recording
Back Pages was recorded at British Grove Studios in London, Your Place or Mine in Glendale, California, and the Tracking Room and Zoomar South Studios in Nashville.

Release and promotion
Back Pages was released on July 26, 2011 by eOne. The release of Back Pages coincidentally fell two days after the sudden death of co-founding America band member Dan Peek.

Musical style
The musical style of Back Pages consists of the classic America vocal and acoustic guitar sound, backed by top Nashville session players, and enhanced by producer Fred Mollin's inclusion of some period sounds, like the sitar-effected guitar on "Woodstock" and the "heavily overdone guitar effects" on "Time of the Season".

Artwork
The album cover photo was taken by Chad Griffith and shows a brown leather-bound manuscript album containing sheet music, lying on a wooden table. The manuscript album cover contains the title words "Back" and "Pages" separated by the band's stylized logo.

Touring
In 2011, America performed 85 concerts throughout the United States, Canada, Italy, France, Guatemala, Honduras, and Chile.

Critical reception

In his review for AllMusic, Stephen Thomas Erlewine gave the album three out of five stars, noting the album's "intimate and friendly" production and the sometimes surprising arrangements, concluding, "It's comfortable and engaging without being complacent; it's a visit with old friends that still can do something unexpected after all these years."

In his review for American Songwriter, Rick Moore gave the album three and a half out of five stars, calling it "a well-done CD for baby boomers and their kids". He praised the song selection for including both older and modern standards, and remarked, "America's voices and ranges don't seem to have changed a bit; if anything, these guys are just getting better, as they sing with the confidence that only age can bring."

Track listing

Personnel
America
 Gerry Beckley – vocals, acoustic guitar
 Dewey Bunnell – vocals, acoustic guitar
with:
 Larry Beaird – banjo, acoustic guitar
 Pat Buchanan – electric guitar
 Mark Knopfler – electric guitar (6)
 Fred Mollin – 12 string acoustic guitar, percussion, synthesizer, backing vocals  
 John Willis – acoustic guitar, electric guitar
 Mike Johnson – pedal steel guitar
 Stuart Duncan – fiddle, mandolin
 Larry Paxton – bass guitar
 John Jarvis – piano, Wurlitzer electric piano
 Tony Harrell – harmonium, organ, piano, synthesizer, Wurlitzer 
 Van Dyke Parks – accordion
 Greg Morrow – drums, percussion
 Jaime Babbitt – vocals
 Jeffrey Foskett – backing vocals
 Russell Terrell – backing vocals

Production
 Fred Mollin – producer 
 Kyle Lehning – engineer, mixing  
 Guy Fletcher – engineer  
 Mark Linett – overdub engineer  
 "Teenage" Dave Salley – overdub engineer  
 Greg Calbi – mastering  
 Paul Grosso – creative director  
 Andrew Kelley – art direction, design  
 Chad Griffith – cover photo
 Henry Diltz – photography  
 Dmitri Kasterine – photography

Release history

References

2011 albums
America (band) albums